The 2020 Dutch Boy 150 was the 13th stock car race of the 2020 ARCA Menards Series, the seventh race of the 2020 Sioux Chief Showdown, and the ninth iteration of the event. The race was held on Saturday, August 29, 2020, in Madison, Illinois at Gateway Motorsports Park, a 1.25 miles (2.01 km) permanent oval-shaped racetrack. The race took the scheduled 120 laps to complete. At race's end, Ty Gibbs of Joe Gibbs Racing would dominate and win his sixth career ARCA Menards Series win and his fourth of the season. To fill out the podium, Chandler Smith of Venturini Motorsports and Sam Mayer of GMS Racing would finish second and third, respectively.

Background 

Known as Gateway Motorsports Park until its renaming in April 2019, World Wide Technology Raceway is a 1.25-mile (2.01 km) paved oval motor racing track in Madison, Illinois, United States. The track previously held Truck races from 1998 to 2010, and returned starting in 2014.

Entry list

Practice 
The only 30-minute practice session was held on Saturday, August 29.

Starting lineup 
ARCA would not hold qualifying for the event, and would decide to determine the starting lineup based on the current 2020 Sioux Chief Showdown owner's standings. As a result, Michael Self of Venturini Motorsports would win the pole.

Race results

References 

2020 ARCA Menards Series
NASCAR races at Gateway Motorsports Park
August 2020 sports events in the United States
2020 in sports in Illinois